A spelling bee is a competition in which contestants are asked to spell words.

Spelling bee may refer to:

Specific spelling bees
 Scripps National Spelling Bee, a highly competitive U.S. spelling bee held in Washington, D.C.
 Postmedia Canspell National Spelling Bee, a former Canadian spelling bee with representation at the Scripps competition
 Spelling Bee of Canada, a charitable spelling bee organization in the Greater Toronto Area
 MaRRS Spelling Bee, an Asian Spelling Bee with word usage rounds

Other
 Spelling Bee (card trick), a magic trick in which certain playing cards are made to appear on cue
 Spelling Bee (pricing game), a pricing game on the game show The Price is Right
 The 25th Annual Putnam County Spelling Bee, a musical comedy based on a fictional spelling bee
 Spellingg Bee, an episode of the TV show Psych
 Spelling Bee (game show), a 1938 UK TV show that was the first television game show
 The New York Times Spelling Bee, a word game distributed in print and electronic format by The New York Times